No, I'm not Byron; I am, yet is a poem written by the Russian poet Mikhail Yuryevich Lermontov in 1832.

Text

<poem>
No, I'm not Byron; I am, yet,
Another choice for the sacred dole,
Like him - a persecuted soul,
But only of the Russian set.
I early start and end the whole,
And will not win the future days;
Like in an ocean, in my soul,
A cargo of lost hopes stays.
Who, oh, my ocean severe,
Could read all secrets in your scroll?
Who'll tell the people my idea?
I'm God or no one at all!</poem>

References

1832 poems
Poetry by Mikhail Lermontov